Barjak (also Romanized as  Barjok and Borjak; also known as Bārjūk) is a village in Shaban Rural District, in the Central District of Nahavand County, Hamadan Province, Iran. At the 2006 census, its population was 307, in 69 families.

References 

Populated places in Nahavand County